Nagwon-dong is a dong, neighbourhood of Jongno-gu in Seoul, South Korea. Nagwon (낙원, 樂園) means "paradise" in Korean. It is a legal dong (법정동 ) governed under its administrative dong (행정동 ), Jongno 1, 2, 3, 4 ga-dong.

Attractions

Nagwon Instrument Arcade
Nagwon Instrument Arcade has traditionally been Korea's largest collection of music stores and is very close to Insa-dong. Built in 1968, the Nagwon building is a pillar-based, mixed-use complex. On the first floor, there is a four lane road and a market below. Above the shopping area, there are apartments. The second and third floors of the Nagwon building has a few hundred music stores clustered together. Various instruments and other music-related equipment such as amps, speakers and karaoke machines can be found there. There are people there to sell or repair instruments for beginners and experts alike. On the fourth floor, there is a theater that used to premiere films and was called the 'Hollywood Theater'. Presently, it has turned into the 'Seoul Art Cinema' and 'dance musical private theater' which play 'Silver Theater' films for senior citizens, independent films, and other specialty films.

See also 
Administrative divisions of South Korea

References

External links
 Jongno-gu Official site in English
 Jongno-gu Official site
 Status quo of Jongno-gu by administrative dong 
 Jongno 1, 2, 3, 4 ga-dong Resident office 
 Origin of Nagwon-dong's name

Neighbourhoods of Jongno-gu